Yang Likun (杨丽坤, April 24, 1941 - July 21, 2000) was a Chinese Yi actress. She is best known for playing the lead role in the romantic comedy film Five Golden Flowers (1959), and winning the Silver Eagle Award for Best Actress for her portrayal of Jin Hua in the film.

Early life 
Yang was born on April 24, 1942, in Mohei, Ning'er County, Yunnan Province. She was an ethnic Yi, of the ethnic minority in China. From a young age, she loved literature and art.

Career 
In 1954, Yang joined the Yunnan Provincial Song and Dance Troupe as a solo dancer.

In 1959, at the age of 18, Yang was selected by Wang Jiayi, the director of Changchun Film Studio, to star as the female lead, Jin Hua, in the romantic comedy film Five Golden Flowers, which reflected the socialist construction of the Bai people during the Great Leap Forward. The film was released in December 1959 and became an immediate sensation, being screened in 46 countries. It won the Silver Eagle Award for Best Film at the 2nd Asian-African Film Festival in Egypt in 1960, and Yang won the Silver Eagle Award for Best Actress.

In 1964, she starred as the female lead, Ashima, in the film Ashima, which reflected the love story of ancient Yi people of Yunnan. Before the release of Ashima, Yang developed a mental disorder after she was obstructed from falling in love, but recovered after hospitalization. In 1965, the release of Ashima was banned by the Ministry of Culture, as it was considered to conflict with the socialist values and "preached the capitalist class sentiment". Ashima was later released to the public in 1978.

After moving to Shanghai in 1978, Yang worked as an actress with Shanghai Film Studio.

Personal life 
In 1973, Yang married Tang Fenglou, a native of Shanghai. The two had twin sons. After the end of the Cultural Revolution, she moved to live in Shanghai in 1978. There, she lived a more stable life and her illness was in remission.

Yang died at her home in Shanghai on July 21, 2000, at the age of 59, due to long term illness and physical deterioration. She had two tombstones erected in Shanghai and Kunming, with half of her ashes at each tombstone.

Filmography 

 Five Golden Flowers (1959)
 Ashima (1978)

See also 

 Qin Yi
 Shangguan Yunzhu
 Sun Weishi

References 

20th-century Chinese actresses
Yi people
1941 births
2000 deaths